Yu Shuxin (Chinese: 虞书欣; pinyin: Yú Shūxīn, born December 18, 1995), also known as Esther Yu, is a Chinese actress and singer. She is a former member of THE9, the project girl group from iQIYI's survival show Youth With You 2. Yu has also gained recognition for her roles in the hit television series Find Yourself (2020), Moonlight (2021) and Love Between Fairy and Devil (2022)

Early life 
Yu was born in Shanghai, China and is the only child in her family. Her parents are real estate moguls and own several companies; Yu herself is also a shareholder and owner of many businesses. For post-secondary education, she attended LASALLE College of the Arts in Singapore and graduated with a degree in Fashion Media and Industries.

Career

2015-2019: Career beginnings 
In 2015, Yu made her acting debut in the wuxia drama Border Town Prodigal, which premiered in 2016. She then subsequently gained recognition for her appearance in the variety program Grade One Freshman. In 2017, Yu continued to play supporting roles in the historical drama The Advisors Alliance, and romance family drama Ordinary Years.

In 2018, Yu played her first leading role in the coming-of-age drama Youth, adapted from the 2016 South Korean drama Hello, My Twenties. In 2019, she starred as a happy-go-lucky actress in the romantic comedy drama My Amazing Boyfriend 2.

2020-present: Rising popularity 
In 2020, Yu participated in the variety program Youth With You 2 and became one of the most popular trainees on the show. She successfully debuted as a member of temporary girl group THE9 on May 30, 2020.  

That same year, Yu gained popularity and recognition with her role as a lovable university student in the hit romance drama Find Yourself, and was nominated for the Audience's Choice award at the 30th China TV Golden Eagle Award. She later portrayed a quirky female investigator in the well-received historical romance I've Fallen For You, and appeared as a recurring guest role in the drama A Love So Romantic. In the 2020 Forbes China Under 30 Elite list, she was included as a notable actress for the Entertainment and Sports industry. 

In 2021, Yu starred as a newcomer editor in the romantic comedy drama Moonlight. On December 5, 2021, THE9 officially disbanded.

In 2022, Yu starred as a lively and innocent immortal in the fantasy romance drama Love Between Fairy and Devil, and a fashion blogger with an Ornithology PhD in environmental romance drama A Romance of the Little Forest. 

Yu is also confirmed as the female lead for fantasy drama Sword and Fairy, adapted from the popular Chinese RPG game of the same name, and historical drama My Journey to You.

Filmography

Film

Television series

Television shows

As regular

As guest

Discography

Awards and nominations

Notes

References

External links
 Yu Shuxin on Sina Weibo

1995 births
Living people
THE9 members
21st-century Chinese actresses
Chinese television actresses
Actresses from Shanghai
LASALLE College of the Arts alumni
Chinese women television presenters
Chinese television presenters
Chinese broadcasters
VJs (media personalities)
Chinese women singers
Chinese idols
Youth With You contestants